The 1997 Berlin Marathon was the 24th running of the annual marathon race held in Berlin, Germany, held on 28 September 1997. Kenya's Elijah Lagat won the men's race in 2:07:41 hours, while the women's race was won by Ireland's Catherina McKiernan in 2:23:44.

Results

Men

Women

References 

 Results. Association of Road Racing Statisticians. Retrieved 2020-04-02.

External links 
 Official website

1997 in Berlin
Berlin Marathon
Berlin Marathon
Berlin Marathon
Berlin Marathon